Weißbach is a river of Bavaria, Germany and Salzburg, Austria. Its source lies at the northern slope of the Dreisesselberg which is one of the Latten Mountains. Part of its course forms a section of the Austria–Germany border.

See also
List of rivers of Bavaria

References

Rivers of Bavaria
Rivers of Salzburg (state)
Rivers of Austria
Rivers of Germany
International rivers of Europe
Austria–Germany border
Border rivers